This is the discography of American disco and soul band the Trammps.

Albums

Studio albums

Compilation albums

Singles

Notes

References

Discographies of American artists
Soul music discographies
Disco discographies